Limbatochlamys pararosthorni is a moth of the family Geometridae first described by Hong-Xiang Han and Da-Yong Xue in 2005. It is found in China (Shaanxi, Gansu, Sichuan and Chongqing).

The length of the forewings is 30–32 mm for males and 33–34 mm for females.

References

Moths described in 2005
Pseudoterpnini